Minny may refer to:

 an abbreviation of the US state of Minnesota and/or the city of Minneapolis
 Annelie Minny (born 1986), South African cricketer
 Qischil Minny (born 1987), Indonesian footballer
 Harriet Marian "Minny" Thackeray (1840-1875), first wife of Leslie Stephen and daughter of William Makepeace Thackeray
 a character in the animated films Cars and Cars 2
 Minnesota–Wisconsin League or "Minny" League, a professional minor baseball league from 1909 to 1912

See also
 Mini (disambiguation)
 Minié (disambiguation)
 Minnie (disambiguation)